Sergei Vyacheslavovich Kiriakov (born 1 January 1970) is a Russian football coach and a former player. He is the manager of FC Leningradets Leningrad Oblast.

Career
Kiriakov was born in Oryol. He played for a few clubs, including FC Dynamo Moscow, Karlsruher SC, Hamburger SV, Tennis Borussia Berlin and Yunnan Hongta.

Kiryakov played for the Russia national football team and was a participant at UEFA Euro 1992 and UEFA Euro 1996.

His younger brother Yegor Kiryakov also played football professionally.

Career statistics

Honours
 European under-19 champion in 1988
 European under-21 champion in 1990
 Legends Cup in 2009

References

External links
 Player profile 
 
 
 

1970 births
Living people
Sportspeople from Oryol
Soviet footballers
Soviet Union under-21 international footballers
Soviet Union international footballers
Russian footballers
Russia international footballers
Dual internationalists (football)
FC Dynamo Moscow players
Karlsruher SC players
Hamburger SV players
Tennis Borussia Berlin players
UEFA Euro 1992 players
UEFA Euro 1996 players
Shandong Taishan F.C. players
Yunnan Hongta players
Soviet Top League players
Russian Premier League players
Bundesliga players
2. Bundesliga players
Expatriate footballers in Germany
Russian expatriate footballers
Expatriate footballers in China
Russian expatriate sportspeople in China
Russian expatriate sportspeople in Germany
Russian football managers
FC Arsenal Tula managers
Russian Premier League managers
Association football forwards
FC Leningradets Leningrad Oblast managers
Russian expatriate football managers
FC FShM Torpedo Moscow players